Nguesso is a surname. Notable people with the surname include:

Antoinette Sassou Nguesso (born 1945), Congolese retired teacher and public figure 
Denis-Christel Sassou Nguesso, Congolese politician
Denis Sassou Nguesso (born 1943), Congolese politician

Surnames of African origin